Manuela Correia Paulino, nicknamed Nelma, (born 15 April 1996) is an Angolan female handball player for Petro de Luanda and the Angolan national team.

She represented Angola at the 2017 World Women's Handball Championship.

References

Angolan female handball players
1996 births
Living people
Handball players at the 2014 Summer Youth Olympics